Shekar Cheshmeh is a village in Dowlatabad Rural District, in the Central District of Abhar County, Zanjan Province, Iran. At the 2006 census, its population was 45, in 9 families.

References 

Populated places in Abhar County